Puzzle Axe is an adventure game for mobile devices that uses a jigsaw puzzle base and integrates a variety of enigmas and unusual elements in the plot. In addition,  a story in the form of animated videos, narrated in English by Rick Jones, comes after each level.

The story takes place in a weird kingdom called Puzzle Axe, where two magical axes were crafted for the royal family. The time has now come for the king to choose his successor among the two son. But, not happy about it, one of the brothers steal an axe and escapes to go sow disorder on the realm. The fate of the universe therefore rests in the hands of the other brother who has to save it!

Puzzle Axe uses the presence of moving pieces inside the puzzles. It also presents several game mechanics such has mazes, gravity, secret codes and more. The animated sequences total over 10 minutes of adventure.

The game was developed by Secret Igloo.

References
 Evan Bourgault "Hacking Things To Pieces In Puzzle Axe", EGM NOW, Boston, September 16, 2013.
 GamerCamp "Joyous puzzle game with an adventurous spirit", Gamer Camp, Toronto, September 30, 2013.
 Stephanie Carmichael "Jigsaw puzzles are cool again in Puzzle Axe: a game of monsters and music", Venture Beat, May 28, 2013.

Mobile games
Adventure games